= Timorodes =

Scientific classification
- Kingdom: Animalia
- Phylum: Arthropoda
- Class: Insecta
- Order: Lepidoptera
- Superfamily: Noctuoidea
- Family: Noctuidae
- Genus: Timorodes; Meyrick, 1902

Genus of moths

Timorodes is a genus of moths of the family Noctuidae.

== Species ==
- Timorodes blepharias Meyrick, 1902
